Elections for the Senate of the Philippines were held on November 11, 1947, with eight of the 24 seats in the Senate being contested. These eight seats were elected regularly; the winners were eligible to serve six-year terms from December 30, 1947 until December 30, 1953. Gubernatorial and local elections were held on the same date.

Summary
Going into the 1947 election, the Senate consisted of nine Liberals, 14 Nacionalista, and one Popular Front (Vicente Y. Sotto). Of the seats up for election in 1947, all eight seats are held by Nacionalistas.

Senate President Jose Avelino, president of the Liberal Party, scored the opposition and said, "the Nacionalista Party of today is not the party of Quezon and Osmeña ... (it is) the party of Hukbalahaps and other dissident elements." In response, Nacionalista Party President Eulogio Rodriguez appealed for the voters to give the opposition a stronger mandate to fiscalize the administration, which they accused of being corrupt and incompetent.

In the 1st Congress, the Liberals hold 14 seats in the Senate, thereby retaining control of the Senate. The Liberals total was reduced to 13 seats pursuant to the Senate Electoral Tribunal resolution in which Senator Carlos Tan (Liberal) was unseated and replaced by Eulogio Rodriguez (Nacionalista) in 1949.

Geronima Pecson became the first woman to be elected in the Senate.

Retiring incumbents

Nacionalista Party 

 Alauya Alonto
 Esteban dela Rama
 Pedro Hernaez
 Vicente Rama
 Proceso Sebastian

Results
Key:
 ‡ Seats up
 + Gained by a party from another party
 √ Held by the incumbent
 * Held by the same party with a new senator

 Replaced by Eulogio Rodriguez as per decision of Senate Electoral Tribunal dated December 16, 1949.

Per party

Defeated incumbents

Nacionalista Party 

 Eulogio Rodriguez originally lost the election, but won an election protest and was seated in 1949.

See also
Commission on Elections
1st Congress of the Philippines

References

External links
 Official website of the Commission on Elections

1947
General election